Govt. Edward College, Pabna is one of the oldest colleges in Bangladesh.

History 
It was established in July 1898 in Pabna. The college was first named as "Pabna Institution" and founded by Shree Gopal Chandra Lahiri, the famous educationist at that time.

This college was later named "Pabna College" in 1906. The college motto was "Knowledge is virtue". Afterwards, Pabna College was named as "Edward College" in honor of the memory of Indian Emperor, Edward VII.

In December, 1898, the college was affiliated under Calcutta University. Many distinguished personnel visited the college. The then first Governor General of Bengal, Lord Tomas David Barron Carmichael visited Edward College and donated Tk. 50000 for the development of the college in 1912. The then Zamindar of Tarash, Pabna, Ray Bahadur Banamali donated Tk. 50000 to the development fund of the college. Many kindhearted persons of education lovers contributed in the development of Edward College. Shreemati Gopi Sundari Dashi and Shree Devendra Narayan Singh donated 46 Bighas of land to Edward College.

On July 20, 1914, Professor Radhikanath Bose was appointed as the Principal of Edward College, Pabna.

Honors courses were introduced in 1954 in Bengali and Economics under Calcutta University.

On March 1, 1968, Edward College was nationalized by the then government of Pakistan. Edward College then became Govt. Edward College.

Nowadays this college plays a vital role in education sector in Bangladesh. Honors and Masters courses of 16 subjects are being taught here. Besides, BA pass course, B.Ss, B.Sc courses are also being taught.

Total number of regular students are 25052. Total number of teachers and supporting staffs are respectively 160 and 118.

Noble alumni
Arun Kumar Basak
Shahabuddin Chuppu, president-elect of Bangladesh
Kamal Lohani
Charu Majumdar

Gallery

References

External links
 Govt. Edward College, Pabna - official site
Category of Pabna Edward College alumni

Colleges affiliated to National University, Bangladesh
Govt. Edward College, Pabna
Universities and colleges in Pabna District
1898 establishments in India
Educational institutions established in 1898